Little Paris is a 2008 German drama film directed by Miriam Dehne.

Cast 
 Sylta Fee Wegmann - Luna
 Nina-Friederike Gnädig - Barbie
  - Ron
 Jasmin Schwiers - Eve
  - Tante Pat
  - G 
 Volker Bruch - Stefan
 Stipe Erceg - Wassily
 Julia Dietze - Silver

References

External links 

2008 drama films
2008 films
German drama films
2000s German films